The Pictou Group is a stratigraphical unit of Late Carboniferous to Permian age in the Cumberland Basin of Atlantic Canada.

It takes the name from Pictou County, Nova Scotia, and was first described in outcrop along the West Branch River John by W.A. Bell in 1926.

Lithology
The Pictou Group is composed of red beds sandstone, mostly subarkose and sublitharenite. Siltstone is also present, also rarely conglomerate and coal. Fossil remains include bivalves, ostracods, fish, amphibians and reptile fragments, as well as rare plant fragments.

Distribution

Relationship to other units
The Pictou Group contains the Balfron, the Tatamagouche, and the Cape John Formations. 
 
The Formation is mostly exposed in outcrops or covered with glacial till. It unconformably overlays the Carboniferous Cumberland Group or the Mississippian Windsor Group.

It is equivalent to the Morien Group of Cape Breton Island and Stellarton Group on central Nova Scotia. The Pictou Group is also a synonym to the Prince Edward Island Group (include the Miminegash, Egmont Bay, Kildare Capes, Hillsborough River and Orby Head formations.

References

Stratigraphy of Canada
Carboniferous System of North America
Permian System of North America
Oil shale in Canada
Oil shale formations